Aquamicrobium  is a genus of gram-negative, aerobic bacteria.

References

Phyllobacteriaceae
Bacteria genera